Rui Machado was the defending champion but decided not to participate.
Martin Kližan won the title, defeating Adrian Ungur 3–6, 6–3, 6–0 in the final.

Seeds

Draw

Finals

Top half

Bottom half

References
 Main draw
 Qualifying draw

2012 Singles
Marrakech Singles